Louis E. Davis (1884–ca. 1962) was an American architect who designed homes and public buildings in Honolulu, Hawaii. During the 1920s, he was involved in laying out the new King Street campus of President William McKinley High School and designing its buildings in a Spanish Colonial Revival style. He employed a similar style (Mission Revival) in designing the 1931 Honolulu Police Station on Merchant Street, which harmonized well with that of the new city hall, Honolulu Hale. Both the old McKinley campus quadrangle and the Merchant Street Historic District are on the National Register of Historic Places.

Architectural styles

Davis was well known for his work in the Spanish Colonial/Mission Revival style, but he also designed a very significant building that is one of the few enduring examples of rustic Mediterranean Revival architecture in the state: the Territorial Board of Agriculture and Forestry Building (1930) at the corner of Keeaumoku and King Streets in Honolulu. For this building, he employed locally quarried sandstone with distinctive green mortar, along with concrete masonry and finer sandstone for such detailing as window sills, lintels, colonnades and casements, topped by a tiled, low-pitched hip roof without eaves.

During the early 1930s, land developer Theo H. Davies & Co. hired Davis to design new homes in a "Monterey" (or Spanish eclectic) style to be built on lots being developed in the new subdivision of Kāhala.  Note:  This is partially correct.  "The first group of Davie's houses had been designed by the Honolulu architect Louis Davis, in early 1932.  But near the end of the year the second group was placed in the hands of the firm's in-house architectural staff (Vladimir Ossipoff was the head of the staff beginning in April 1932).  Ossipoff did not disappoint."  He referred to this style as "Modified Monterey" using Hawaiian influences.

Davis is also credited as the architect of several of Hawaii's classic movie theatres. The Princess Theatre opened in 1922 at 1236 Fort Street. It was remodeled in 1939, renovated in 1958 for Cinerama, closed in 1969, then demolished. The New Pawaa Theatre opened in 1929 at 1550 South King Street. Its exterior and distinctive Spanish-style interior was renovated in 1962, when it was renamed the Cinerama, then closed in 1999 to become an auto-parts store. The New Palama Theatre opened in 1930 at 701 North King Street with 1,100 seats. This ornate Chinese-style building was leased and renamed the Zamboanga Theatre in 1970, but became retail space and is now a church. The rural Waipahu Theatre, with its graceful sloping tile roof, opened in late 1930 on Depot Road, across from the Waipahu Sugar Mill. Sold in 1970, it is now a church. In 1931, Davis designed the Lihue Theatre on the Island of Kauai. It was damaged in two hurricanes in 1982 and 1992 and its auditorium was demolished for senior citizen housing but the facade and lobby were retained and restored.

Selected works
Princess Theatre, November 8, 1922 (with C.B. Ripley & Ralph Fishbourne)
McKinley High School, 1924
New Pawaa Theatre, January 3, 1929
New Palama Theatre, April 19, 1930
Waipahu Theatre, December 21, 1930
Lipolani house, 1930
Agriculture and Forestry Building, 1930
Honolulu Police Station, 1931
Lihue Theatre (Kaua'i), October 4, 1931
Pahonu, 1933 Private residence in Waimanolo made famous in the television series Magnum PI razed

Gallery

Notes

References
Angell, Lowell (2011). Theatres of Hawaii. Charleston: Arcadia Publishing. , 
Cheever, David, and Scott Cheever (2003). Pōhaku: The Art & Architecture of Stonework in Hawaii. Honolulu: Editions Limited.
Sakamoto, Dean, Vladimir Ossipoff, Karla Britton, Kenneth Frampton, Diana Murphy (2008). Hawaiian Modern: The Architecture of Vladimir Ossipoff. New Haven: Yale University Press. , 

1884 births
20th-century American architects
Hawaiian architecture
Architects from Hawaii
Year of death missing
1960s deaths